The 10 cm Gebirgshaubitze M 8 was a mountain howitzer used by Austria-Hungary during World War I. It was the first Austrian howitzer to use a modern hydraulic variable-recoil system. It used the same ammunition as the earlier 10 cm Gebirgshaubitze M 99, which was shown to be accurate, but lacked sufficient power to destroy bunkers, during World War I. It had a gun shield. It could be mounted on a special sled carriage designated 10 cm M. 8 Gebirgsschleife designed to allow for high-angle fire between +43° and 70° elevation. This sled was transported on a special bedding cart with removable wheels. The wheels were removed when in position to fire.

The 10 cm Gebirgshaubitze M 10 was virtually identical except that it had its traversing and elevating handwheels on different sides and it was not given a high-angle mount.

References 
 Ortner, M. Christian. The Austro-Hungarian Artillery From 1867 to 1918: Technology, Organization, and Tactics. Vienna, Verlag Militaria, 2007 
  10 cm M.8 und M. 10 Gebirgshaubitze. heeresgeschichten.at. Retrieved 28 January 2014.

World War I howitzers
Mountain artillery
World War I mountain artillery
World War I artillery of Austria-Hungary
104 mm artillery